Caloptilia theivora is a moth of the family Gracillariidae. It is known from Brunei, China (Zhejiang, Gansu, Guangdong, Guanxi, Guizhou, Hainan, Henan, Hubei, Hunan, Jiangxi, Sichuan, Yunnan, Anhui and Fujian), Hong Kong, India, Indonesia (Java), Japan (Kyūshū, Shikoku, Honshū), Korea, Malaysia (West Malaysia), Sri Lanka, Taiwan, Thailand and Vietnam.

The wingspan is 10–14 mm.

The larvae feed on Camellia japonica, Camellia sasanqua, Camellia theifera and Thea species, including Thea sinensis. They mine the leaves of their host plant. The mine is found on the underside of the leaf.

References

theivora
Moths of Asia
Moths described in 1891